For the Demented is the sixteenth studio album by Canadian thrash metal band Annihilator, released on November 3, 2017.

Background and production
Over a year after the release of Suicide Society (2015), Annihilator began working on a follow-up album. Founding member and guitarist Jeff Waters told Metal Wani in December 2016:

In February 2017, Waters said that the sixteenth Annihilator studio album was being co-produced by bassist Rich Gray (formerly Hinks), making it the "first time I've actually had somebody else in the studio since 1990 (Never, Neverland) working with me on stuff." On September 12, 2017, it was announced that the album, now titled For the Demented, would be released on November 3; more details on the album, including track listing and artwork, and the music video for "Twisted Lobotomy" were released on the same day. In support of For the Demented, Annihilator (along with Death Angel) opened for Testament on the European Brotherhood of the Snake tour, which took place in November and December 2017.

Track listing

Personnel
Credits are adapted from the album's liner notes.

Annihilator
 Jeff Waters − vocals, guitars, bass, drum programming
 Aaron Homma − lead guitar , backing vocals

Additional musicians
 Dan Beehler − backing vocals

Production
 Jeff Waters − production, recording, mixing, editing, mastering
 Rich Gray − co-producer
 Gyula Havancsák − cover art, artwork, layout, design
 Jasmina Vrcko – photography

Charts

References

2017 albums
Annihilator (band) albums